Victor Jean Marie Sonnemans  (25 October 1874 in Brussels – 3 October 1962 in Schaerbeek) was a Belgian water polo player and  won  silver medal at the 1900 Summer Olympics.

See also
 List of Olympic medalists in water polo (men)

References

External links
 

Belgian male water polo players
Olympic swimmers of Belgium
Olympic water polo players of Belgium
Olympic silver medalists for Belgium
Water polo players at the 1900 Summer Olympics
Olympic medalists in water polo
1874 births
1962 deaths
Medalists at the 1900 Summer Olympics
Sportspeople from Brussels